Wulf Reinicke is an East German retired slalom canoeist who competed in the early 1970s. He won two medals at the 1971 ICF Canoe Slalom World Championships in Meran with a gold in the C-1 team event and a silver in the C-1 event.

References

German male canoeists
Possibly living people
Year of birth missing (living people)
Medalists at the ICF Canoe Slalom World Championships